is a former Japanese football player.

Club statistics

References

External links

Profile at output.simseed.net

1982 births
Living people
Shizuoka Sangyo University alumni
Association football people from Shizuoka Prefecture
Japanese footballers
J2 League players
Japan Football League players
Thespakusatsu Gunma players
V-Varen Nagasaki players
Association football forwards